Qarloq (also Romanized as Qārloq and Qārleq) is a village in Garmkhan Rural District, Garmkhan District, Bojnord County, North Khorasan Province, Iran. At the 2006 census, its population was 609, in 151 families.

References 

Populated places in Bojnord County